T-complex protein 1 subunit zeta-2 is a protein that in humans is encoded by the CCT6B gene.

This gene encodes a molecular chaperone that is a member of the TRiC complex. This complex consists of two identical stacked rings, each containing eight different proteins. Unfolded polypeptides enter the central cavity of the complex and are folded in an ATP-dependent manner. The complex folds various proteins, including actin and tubulin. Alternate transcriptional splice variants of this gene have been observed but have not been thoroughly characterized.

References

External links

Further reading